The Abd al-Wahid Mosque is a mosque and one of the remains of Mamluk architecture in Tripoli, Lebanon.
Stories tell that the Muslim Abd al-Wahid al-Miknasi from Meknes was visiting Tripoli after its Muslim conquest from the crusaders. He stayed at the khan of a Christian who didn't treat him well. The wealthy Abd al-Wahid offered to buy the khan and after its acquisition transformed it into a mosque.
The stories of a transformation of a khan into a mosque can be supported by material evidence: That the mihrab is located at an angle to the qibla suggests that an older wall was reused.

The mosque has two domes, one over the mihrab and one over a tomb chamber, the latter being ribbed. It has a small and simple minaret with an octagonal shaft. On its top eight windows open to each of its eight sides of which three have been closed. It is covered by a small dome.

Sources

References

Mosques in Tripoli, Lebanon
Mamluk architecture in Lebanon
Mosques completed in the 1300s